The 2017 International Challenger Quanzhou was a professional tennis tournament played on hard courts. It was the first edition of the tournament which was part of the 2017 ATP Challenger Tour. It took place in Quanzhou, China between 20 and 25 March 2017.

Singles main draw entrants

Seeds

 1 Rankings are as of 6 March 2017.

Other entrants
The following players received wildcards into the singles main draw:
  Bai Yan
  Te Rigele
  Xia Zihao
  Zhang Zhizhen

The following player received entry into the singles main draw using a protected ranking:
  Yuki Bhambri

The following players received entry from the qualifying draw:
  Matteo Berrettini
  Hubert Hurkacz
  Andrea Pellegrino
  Lorenzo Sonego

The following player received entry as a lucky loser:
  Shuichi Sekiguchi

Champions

Singles

 Thomas Fabbiano def.  Matteo Berrettini 7–6(7–5), 7–6(9–7).

Doubles

 Hsieh Cheng-peng /  Peng Hsien-yin def.  Andre Begemann /  Aliaksandr Bury 3–6, 6–4, [10–7].

References

International Challenger Quanzhou